Universitas Multimedia Nusantara (abbreviated as UMN) is a private university  located in Gading Serpong, Tangerang, Banten, Indonesia. The university was founded by Kompas Gramedia Group on 25 November 2005 and officially launched in a ceremony at the Hotel Santika, Jakarta on 20 November 2006.

History
Multimedia Nusantara University had been established on the initiative of Dr. (HC) Jakob Oetama, the founder of Kompas Gramedia. The initiative was then come into realisation by works among the leaders of Kompas Gramedia, namely: Agung Adiprasetyo (CEO), Teddy Surianto (Business Development), the ranks of Kompas Gramedia Board of Directors and the Founding Committee, led by Dr. Ir. P.M. Winarno, M.Kom. (Chairman) and Ir. Budi Susanto, M.M. (Vice Chairman). Furthermore, on November 25, 2005, UMN of operational permits issued by the Minister of National Education Republic of Indonesia and on November 20, 2006, and officially launched in a ceremony at the Hotel Santika, Jakarta. The ceremony was inaugurated by Dr. Ir. Dodi Nandika Secretary General of the Ministry of National Education.

Being relatively new, UMN had conferred degrees to its first batch of graduates on Saturday, 26 November 2011, with the appearance of Minister for Tourism and Creative Economy, Mari Elka Pangestu, who gave speech on this occasion. Two bachelors from the first batch were given international scholarships to continue with their studies. The following universities, Tokyo Denki University Japan and Universiti Tunku Abdul Rahman Malaysia, both give a full tuition scholarship for these talented bachelors. In the other hand, almost 80% of the first UMN graduates has been welcomed and accepted in various professional working fields.

Undergraduate programs

Faculty of Business

Faculty of Information and Technology

Faculty of Communication

Faculty of Art and Design

Facilities

Administrative Buildings

Original Campus: Rectorate & Classrooms 
The UMN campus was inaugurated on December 2, 2009  with its original layout which included the classroom building and rectorate. The university's main entrance is located on the North side of the classroom building, with the main lobby located in the atrium between the two buildings.

New Campus: Raih Juara 1 
UMN's New Media Tower - 'Raih Juara 1' - is a 12-storey eco-friendly building that was inaugurated on September 8, 2012. The building - whose energy-saving features were designed by the energy efficiency consultancy Synergy Efficiency Solutions - was awarded the title of 'Most Energy Efficient New Building' in the 2013 National Energy Efficiency Awards.

Dormitories 
The dormitories consists of three buildings: Building A (specifically for men), Building B and Building C (specifically for women). Each building contains two types of rooms: either single or double occupancy. Each room contains all accessories necessary for basic student life (beds, wardrobes, etc.). The dormitory buildings are also equipped with their own parking facilities, lounges with TVs, and welcome lobbies.

Educational Facilities

Photo Studio 
The UMN photography studio is equipped with the newest professional equipment. Students can take advantage of high-resolution digital SLR cameras with a wide arrange of lenses. Also available are backdrops, professional lighting with flash triggers, umbrellas, softboxes, snoots, barn doors, filters, honeycombs, and much more. The photo studio is used for lectures, workmanship coursework, research, and a final projects.

TV Studio 
The TV studios can be adapted to the needs of various media courses - both live and recorded television, news and entertainment. Tools available include teleprompters (screen monitor that displays texts to the presenter), Character Generator (computer graphics viewer and text on the television screen), a switcher (equipment to transfer images from one camera to another camera), and more.

Radio Studio 
The radio study broadcasts daily via 107.7 FM (also accessible via online streaming at www.radio.umn.ac.id). The broadcast starts at eight in the morning until five in the afternoon, Monday to Saturday. Radio UMN is driven by students with a variety of quality programs such as Gogo Archipelago (program-me discussing cultural diversity in Indonesia), Serpong First, and Talk n Easy (discussing the successful young Indonesians).

Multimedia Laboratoriums 
Designed for editing a wide array of media, UMN's 16 computer labs are equipped with all the newest hardware and software for audio, video, and graphic design. This includes a Computer Graphics Lab equipped with iMac computers.

Library 
The Library occupies an area of 600m2. UMN library has a collection of tens of thousands of course books, reference books, science texts, and magazines (domestic and foreign) - all equipped with RFID technology. The library also provides electronic services. E-journals such as IEEE and Proquest are available.

Student Lounge

Sports Facilities 
UMN's sports facilities include outdoor basketball and badminton courts and indoor soccer courts. These facilities are adaptable to various sports including martial arts, hockey, yoga, and more.

Graduates and Notable People

Multimedia Nusantara University has opened its new student's admission since the 2007 academic cohort. The inaugural lecture of the first batch was held on September 3, 2007, with the theme "Human Resource Development to Meet the ICT Era." In order to make the inaugural lecture a success, UMN invited guest lecturers such as Prof. Dr. Ir. Mohamad Nuh (Then Minister of Communication and Information), Dr(Hc) Jakob Oetama (Founder of Kompas Gramedia), Roy Suryo (Telematics Expert), Dra. Puspita Zorawar, M.PsiT (Communication and Psychology Expert).

Initially, it opened 7 study programmes (Management, Accounting, Information System, Informatics, Computer Engineering, Strategic Communication, and Visual Design Communication), but in 2016 it opened 4 more programmes (Electronics Engineering, Engineering Physics, Architecture, and Film), 2 more in 2017 (Hospitality and Journalism), 1 in 2019 (Master of Technology Management), 1 in 2021 (Strategic Communication by Distance Learning), and one more (Master of Communication Science) in preparation to the total of 16 study programmes.

References

External links
 
 Scholarship Information of Universitas Multimedia Nusantara
  Lulusan Baru UMN
  8 Film Mahasiswa UMN Tampil di Ultima Screen

2006 establishments in Indonesia
Educational institutions established in 2006
Universities in Banten
Universities in Indonesia
Kompas Gramedia Group